The anonymous pilgrim of Piacenza, sometimes simply called the Piacenza Pilgrim, was a sixth-century Christian pilgrim from Piacenza in northern Italy who travelled to the Holy Land at the height of Byzantine rule in the 570s and wrote a narrative of his pilgrimage. This anonymous pilgrim was erroneously identified as Antoninus of Piacenza or Antoninus Martyr out of confusion with Saint Antoninus of Piacenza, who died in 303 and is venerated as a martyr.

The Piacenza pilgrim's description of sites and traditions are sometimes inaccurate, as he tends to confuse places from the same area, or such which are in Egypt. The travel descriptions of the Piacenza pilgrim are still valued by researchers because they sometimes contain information about local customs and traditions not mentioned in any other text.

The pilgrim's itinerary documents the extent of the sixth-century trade catering to the pious pilgrims in the Holy Land: "We went to Cana, where our Lord was present at the marriage feast," the Piacenza Pilgrim reports, "and we reclined on the very couch." Inspired by such a vivid figuration of Biblical truth, Antoninus indulged the classic tourists' act: "and there, unworthy as I was, I wrote the names of my parents".

Antoninus' descriptions of the chalice of onyx that was venerated in the Church of the Holy Sepulchre and of the Holy Lance in the Basilica of Mount Zion are early attestations of the cultus of these two relics.

Of the historical Piacenza pilgrim, F. Bechtel reported in The Catholic Encyclopedia (1910)."In manuscripts he is sometimes styled Antoninus the Martyr, through ignorant confusion of the writer with the martyr St. Antoninus who is venerated at Piacenza. He is the last writer who saw Palestine before the Moslem conquest. Although he covered in his travels nearly the same extensive territory as the Spanish nun, his work contains but few details not found in other writers; it is, moreover, marred by gross errors and by fabulous tales which betray the most naive credulity."

Notes

Editions
P. Geyer (ed.), in Itineraria et alia geographica, Corpus Christianorum series Latina, Volume 175 (Turnhout: Brepols, 1965), pp. 129–53.
Aubrey Stewart (trans.), Of the Holy Places Visited by Antoninus Martyr, Palestine Pilgrims' Text Society, 1887.

See also
Chronological list of early Christian geographers and pilgrims to the Holy Land who wrote about their travels, and other related works
Late Roman and Byzantine period
Eusebius of Caesarea (260/65–339/40), Church historian and geographer of the Holy Land
Anonymous "Pilgrim of Bordeaux", pilgrim to the Holy Land (333-4) who left travel descriptions
Egeria, pilgrim to the Holy Land (c. 381–384) who left a detailed travel account
St Jerome (Hieronymus; fl. 386–420), translator of the Bible, brought an important contribution to the topography of the Holy Land
Madaba Map, mosaic map of the Holy Land from the second half of the 6th century
Early Muslim period
Paschal Chronicle, 7th-century Greek Christian chronicle of the world
Arculf, pilgrim to the Holy Land (c. 680) who left a detailed narrative of his travels
Medieval period
John of Würzburg, pilgrim to the Holy Land (1160s) who left travel descriptions,

6th-century Italo-Roman people
Pilgrimage accounts
Holy Land travellers
People from Piacenza
Holy Land during Byzantine rule
Christian pilgrimages
Unidentified people
6th-century Italian writers